Zürich Hardbrücke railway station is a railway station in the central part of the Swiss city of Zürich. It is situated below Hardbrücke, a road bridge that lends its name to the station.

History 
In conjunction with the extension of tram route 8 from Hardplatz over Hardbrücke to Hardturm in 2017, the station was partly rebuilt and platforms 2 and 3 were renewed.

Layout and facilities 
The station sits in the approach to Zürich Hauptbahnhof (Zürich HB), Zürich's main station, on the Zürich–Baden line near its junction with the Käferberg Tunnel variant of the Zürich–Winterthur line, and to the north of the through tracks that carry long-distance passenger and occasional freight trains. It lies below the Hardbrücke, a road bridge that crosses the rail tracks and forms an important north–south connection within the city. The line to Oerlikon is sloped and at a higher level, and thus the platforms are not all at the same level.

Access to the station's platforms is either from the Hardbrücke bridge or an underpass.  The bridge has station entrances and exits on either side, with separate access to and from all platforms. The entrance to the underpass is to the north of the station, below the bridge and adjacent to the bicycle and car parking. Access to all platforms from both the bridge and the underpass is through stairs and elevators. The station's underpass has a kiosk and a small supermarket.

The station is connected to the municipal tram and bus network. Zürich trolleybus routes 33, 72 and Zürich bus route 83, and since December 2017 tram route 8 serve the adjacent stop above on the bridge, called Bahnhof Hardbrücke. All routes are operated by VBZ.

Operation 
The station is a major node in the Zürich S-Bahn system. Eastward, all trains from Hardbrücke station operate via low-level platforms 41–44 at Hauptbahnhof, continuing to Stadelhofen station through the Hirschengraben Tunnel. They provide, for most of the day, 16 trains per hour (tph) to or from both of these two inner-city stations.

Other stations served include:

Services 
Summary of all regional train services by Zürich S-Bahn at Zürich Hardbrücke:
 
 
 
 
 
 
 
 
 
 
 

During weekends, there are five nighttime S-Bahn services (SN1, SN5, SN6, SN7, SN9) calling at Hardbrücke station, offered by ZVV:

Gallery

References

External links 

Swiss Federal Railways stations
Hardbrucke
Railway stations in Switzerland opened in 1982